Thomas Deacon (1868 – 21 July 1921) was a Welsh international rugby union forward who played club rugby for Swansea and international rugby for Wales

Rugby career 
Swansea born Deacon began his career with Morriston before switching to Swansea in 1890.  The next season, he was selected to represent the Wales national team against Ireland in the 1891 Home Nations Championship. Deacon was one of four new Welsh players brought into the pack for the match, including Swansea teammates David and John Samuel, following losses in the first two matches of the tournament against England and Scotland. Played at Stradey Park and led by Llanelli's Willie Thomas, Wales beat the Irish 6–4, but this match was Deacon's only international win of his career.

Deacon was reselected to play in all three matches of the 1892 Championship, now under the captaincy of Newport legend Arthur 'Monkey' Gould. Although the pack now contained the likes of Wallace Watts and Arthur Boucher the team failed to win a single match of the competition, though the selectors kept faith with the majority of the pack throughout. The next season the 1892 pack was reselected almost en masse, Deacon being the only obvious omission, his Wales career was over.

International matches played
Wales
 1891
 1891
 1891, 1892

Bibliography

References 

Welsh rugby union players
Wales international rugby union players
Rugby union forwards
Rugby union players from Swansea
Swansea RFC players
1868 births
1921 deaths